Benjamin Franklin High School, also referred to as Franklin High School, Livonia Franklin and FHS, is a public high school located in Livonia, Michigan, a suburb west of Detroit.

History

Established in September 1961 a sophomore class attended classes at nearby Bentley High School during the 1961–62 school year.  Classes were then taught at FHS when that building opened in September 1962.  The school celebrated its first graduating class in June 1964.  During the 1968–69 school year, a sophomore class from Churchill High School attended classes at Franklin High School as construction commenced on that school building.

International Baccalaureate Program

Franklin High School is the first public school in Wayne County to offer the IB Diploma program. Faculty members have been trained in the areas of Administration, Coordination, Visual Arts, History of the Americas, Spanish, Biology, Chemistry, Mathematics, English and Theory of Knowledge. At the training sessions, teachers spend 3–5 days learning about international perspectives regarding pedagogy, curricular requirements, and standards of assessment.

Livonia Career Technical Center
The Livonia Public School system offers classes at the Livonia Career Technical Center.  The Career Center hosts state approved career technical programs to students of Churchill, Franklin, and Stevenson High Schools.  Their mission is to prepare students for careers in a rapidly changing technological society, as well as develop a foundation for future learning.  This offers students the opportunity to explore classes in their future career choice.  Along with classroom experience, students have opportunities for field trips, guest speakers, interactive distance learning, on-line instruction, technology representative of the industry, internships, leadership and service learning projects.  The Career Center offers students to gain quality experience while in high school.

Athletics

State championships
 Football: 1975
 Girls Softball: 1986
 Girls Pompon: 2022

Boys Varsity Bowling: 2022

Notable alumni

Bernie Carbo: MLB OF/DH (Cincinnati Reds, St. Louis Cardinals, Boston Red Sox, Milwaukee Brewers, Cleveland Indians, Pittsburgh Pirates  (Class of 1965)
Charlie Collins, Republican member of the Arkansas House of Representatives since 2010. (Class of 1981)
Art Regner: Detroit sports radio personality, WDFN, WXYT, Fox Sports Detroit (Class of 1975)
Amy Roloff: Mother of family featured in Little People, Big World (Class of 1980)
Mike Donnelly: NHL (New York Rangers, Buffalo Sabres, Los Angeles Kings, Dallas Stars, New York Islanders) (Class of 1981)
Mike Modano: NHL: (Minnesota North Stars, Dallas Stars, Detroit Red Wings) (Class of 1988)

References

External links

 Franklin High School
 Fortin runs Franklin to first district title The Detroit News.
 Woolfork speaks on commitment to Grand Valley State

Public high schools in Michigan
Educational institutions established in 1961
Livonia, Michigan
Schools in Wayne County, Michigan
1961 establishments in Michigan